Sunes familie is a Danish children's and family comedy that premiered in Denmark on 10 October 1997.

The film is a Danish adaptation of the film Sune's Summer, focusing more on the book rather than the Swedish film. The family's last name was changed from Andersson to Andersen and their first names were changed from Anna to Anne, Isabelle to Isabel, Håkan to Håkon. Sune's girlfriend Sophie is instead called Sofie. Locations were also changed so that the family is living Denmark instead of Sweden.

Actors
Claus Bue
Vibeke Hastrup
Per Damgaard Hansen
Sofie Lassen-Kahlke
Niels Anders Thorn
Inge Sofie Skovbo
Stephanie Leon
Erni Arneson
Joachim Knop
Jarl Friis-Mikkelsen
Henrik Lykkegaard
Anders Nyborg
Mari-Anne Jespersen
Peter Jorde
Susan Olsen
Folmer Rubæk
Bodil Jørgensen
Jarl Forsman
Jan Hertz
Hans Henrik Voetmann

References

External links

1997 films
1990s Danish-language films
1990s children's comedy films
Danish comedy films
Danish children's films
Films based on works by Anders Jacobsson and Sören Olsson
Films set in Denmark
Films about vacationing
1997 comedy films